The Christmas Album is the twentieth studio album by Neil Diamond and his first to feature Christmas music. It features orchestral and choir arrangements by David Campbell. The album reached No. 8 on the Billboard 200 album sales chart, No. 50 on the UK album sales chart, and No. 30 on Australian music chart.

In his review music critic Johnny Loftus states, "While Neil Diamond's The Christmas Album is designed almost exclusively for his adult contemporary constituency, the vocalist still manages to light up most of the obviousness of these standards with his trademark gritty soul and flair for inflection."

On August 7, 2001, The Christmas Album was certified Double Platinum by the RIAA for shipment of two million copies in the United States since its 1992 release.   it was the twenty-fifth best-selling Christmas/holiday album in the United States of the SoundScan era of music sales tracking (March 1991–present), having sold 1,910,000 copies according to SoundScan.

Track listing

Personnel 
 Neil Diamond – lead vocals (all tracks)
 David Campbell – arrangements (1-6, 11, 12, 13), conductor (1-6, 8, 10, 12, 13, 14), choir arrangements (7), orchestra arrangements and conductor (7), BGV arrangements (8, 10)
 Robbie Buchanan – acoustic piano (2, 14), keyboards (3-6, 8, 13)
 Ladd Thomas – Hammond organ (6, 11)
 Alan Lindgren – acoustic piano (7, 12), acoustic piano intro (8), BGV arrangements (8), orchestra arrangements (14)
 Bob Mann – guitar (1, 5), acoustic guitar (3, 12), electric guitar (7)
 Dean Parks – electric guitar (3), guitar (6, 8, 13), mandolin (6)
 Andrew Gold – acoustic guitar (4, 10)
 Waddy Wachtel – electric guitar (4, 10), guitar (13)
 Louis Gutierrez – guitar solo (7)
 Dan Dugmore – pedal steel guitar (12)
 Jimmy Johnson – bass guitar (3, 6, 8)
 Bob Glaub – bass (4, 10, 13)
 Bob Magnusson – double bass (5)
 Leland Sklar – bass guitar (7, 12)
 Peter Asher – drum programming (3), tambourine (7, 10), rhythm track arrangements (7, 10)
 Russ Kunkel – drums (4-8, 13)
 Nathaniel Kunkel – drums (10)
 Michael Fisher – percussion (3, 8)
 Marvin B. Gordy – percussion (3)
 Warren Ham – harmonica (4)
 Plas Johnson – tenor saxophone solo (5)
 Gavyn Wright – concertmaster (1, 2, 7, 10, 13, 14)
 The London Symphony Orchestra – orchestra (1, 2, 7, 10, 13, 14)
 The Angel Voices Choir – choir (1, 7)
 The Ambrosian Singers – choir (2, 7, 14)
 John McCarthy – choir director (2, 7, 14)
 The Lower School Chorus of Viewpoint School – choir (7)
 Robert Prizeman – boys’ choir conductor (7)
 Marcie Parker – children’s choir conductor (7)
 Donny Gerard, Raven Kane, Josef Powell, Julia Waters, Maxine Waters and Oren Waters – doo-wop backing vocals (8)
 139th Street Quartet – vocals and arrangements (9)
 Jim Hass, Jon Joyce, Gene Morford and Jerry Whitman – doo-wop backing vocals (10)
 L.A. Mass Choir – choir (11)
 Donald Taylor – choir director (11)
 Frank Lindgren – choir arrangements (14)

Production 
 Producer – Peter Asher
 Production Coordinator – Ivy Skoff
 Project Coordinator – Sam Cole
 Recorded and Mixed by Frank Wolf
 Assistant Recording and Mixing by Nathaniel Kunkel and Brett Swain.
 Additional Recording and Mixing by Chad Blinman, Alec Marcou, Gil Morales, Marnie Riley and Eric Rudd.
 Recorded at Arch Angel Studios, The Complex, Studio 55 and Ocean Way Recording (Los Angeles, CA); Conway Studios (Hollywood, CA); The Hit Factory (New York, NY): Abbey Road Studios (London, England).
 Mixed at Conway Studios
 Mastered by George Marino at Sterling Sound (New York, NY).
 Art Direction – David Kirschner
 Design – Jan Weinberg
 Cover Photography – Eugine Adibari
 Liner Notes – Neil Diamond

See also
The Christmas Album, Volume II

Certifications

References

Neil Diamond albums
1992 albums
Albums produced by Peter Asher
Columbia Records Christmas albums
Christmas albums by American artists
Pop Christmas albums